Senegalia hereroensis is a species of trees in the genus Senegalia. It is indigenous to Southern Africa.

Senegalia hereroensis may be confused with Senegalia caffra but it has more robust prickles.

The larvae of the moths Phyllonorycter leucaspis and Heniocha dyops (marbled emperor) feed on S. hereroensis.

References

External links
 

hereroensis
Plants described in 2013
Flora of South Africa